Robert Alan Newton (born 10 May 1981 in Nottingham, England) is a British hurdling athlete. As of 2004, he was Britain's number one sprint hurdler. However, competing for Team GB at the 2004 Summer Olympics in Athens, Newton failed to qualify for the second round of the 110 m hurdles competition. He was the only openly gay British Olympian that year.

After not racing at all in 2005, Newton transitioned to the 400 metre hurdles along with the 110 metre hurdles in 2006, achieving a 51.88 personal best in that event. He has no recorded races since 2006. In 2012, he worked as a sports massage therapist.

National titles

 1997: Amateur Athletics Association U17 400m hurdles gold medal winner
 1999: English Schools' 110m hurdles gold medal winner
 1999: AAA U20 110m hurdles gold medal winner
 2000: AAA U20 110m hurdles silver medalist
 2001: AAA U23 110m hurdles gold medal winner
 2003: Inter-Countries 110m hurdles gold medal winner
 2004: British National Championships 110m hurdles gold medal winner

Personal bests
 110 m hurdles Personal Best: 13.36 in 2004
 In the UK All-time Top Ten with a 60m hurdles personal best of 7.69, in the 2004 Norwich Union Indoor Trials.

References

1981 births
Living people
English male hurdlers
Olympic athletes of Great Britain
Athletes (track and field) at the 2004 Summer Olympics
World Athletics Championships athletes for Great Britain
LGBT track and field athletes
English LGBT sportspeople
Sportspeople from Nottingham
Gay sportsmen